Eremaea purpurea is a plant in the myrtle family, Myrtaceae and is endemic to the south-west of Western Australia. It is a shrub with erect branches, small leaves and purple flowers in pairs on the ends of the branches. The fruits are woody, cup-shaped capsules which release their seeds when dry.

Description
The branches point upwards and the young stems are densely covered with hair. There are a few long, soft hairs on the upper surface and edges of the leaves.

The flowers are pink to deep pink and are borne usually in pairs on the ends of the branches. The stamens, which give the flower its colour are arranged in 5 bundles, each containing 14 to 33 stamens.

Taxonomy and naming
Eremaea purpurea was first formally described in 1964 by Charles Gardner in Journal of the Royal Society of Western Australia. The specific epithet (purpurea) is from the Latin purpureus meaning "purple".

Distribution and habitat
Eremaea purpurea occurs in the Darling district in the Geraldton Sandplains, Jarrah Forest and Swan Coastal Plain biogeographic regions. It grows in sandy soils, often on roadsides and in damp depressions.

Conservation
Eremaea purpurea is classified as "not threatened" by the Western Australian Government Department of Parks and Wildlife.

References

purpurea
Myrtales of Australia
Plants described in 1964
Endemic flora of Western Australia
Taxa named by Charles Gardner